John O. Stubbs is a Canadian academic.  He was president of Trent University and Simon Fraser University.

Stubbs began his career as a historian and political scientist, specializing in the history of 20th century British politics and media. He distinguished himself as a teacher and administrator at the University of Waterloo, serving in various positions including associate dean of arts. Stubbs was appointed president of Trent University in 1987, a post that he held until 1993, when he was appointed for a five-year term as president of Simon Fraser University in British Columbia.  His term was renewed in April 1997.

In 1997, he was forced to resign for his mishandling of a controversial sexual harassment case.  Since then he has been a member of Simon Fraser's history department. In 1998, he was appointed a board member of the Canada Millennium Scholarship Foundation.

Education
B.A. in modern history, University of Toronto, 1966; M.Sc. in international history, the London School of Economics, 1967;
D.Phil., Oxford University, 1973.
Lecturer, Trent University, 1967–1969.
Professor, University of Waterloo, 1973–1986.
Visiting lecturer (1979), visiting fellow (1986), St. Catherine's (Oxford).

See also
 List of University of Waterloo people

Sources
Ian Mulgrew, "President’s role in sex harassment case scars his career", Vancouver Province, 19 July 1997, B3
"U of G's Len Conolly new Trent president", Kitchener-Waterloo Record, 9 July 1993, B4
Robert Matas, "Stubbs resigns post as SFU president", The Globe and Mail, 13 December 1997, A9
Sarah Schmidt, "Scholarship fund failed, report says: Chretien legacy project", National Post, 6 November 2003, A4.
http://www.sfu.ca/history/stubbs.htm
"SFU President appointed to second five year term," SFU News, April 3, 1997, Vol 8 No 7, https://www.sfu.ca/archive-sfunews/sfnews/1997/April3/president.html

Alumni of the London School of Economics
Year of birth missing (living people)
Living people
Academic staff of Simon Fraser University
20th-century Canadian historians
Canadian male non-fiction writers
Presidents of Trent University
21st-century Canadian historians